CMPL may refer to:
 Clementi Public Library, a public library in Clementi, Singapore
 Clinton-Macomb Public Library, Clinton Charter Township, Michigan
 "c-mpl", the human homologue of the myeloproliferative leukemia virus oncogene
 Thrombopoietin, also known as "C-Mpl", the protein corresponding to the above
 The Central Military Pathological Laboratory, now known as AFIP Rawalpindi
 The cmpl instruction in the x86-64 instruction set